Carrie Rachel Brownstein (born September 27, 1974) is an American musician, actress, writer, director, and comedian. She first came to prominence as a member of the band Excuse 17 before forming the rock trio Sleater-Kinney. During a long hiatus from Sleater-Kinney, she formed the group Wild Flag. During this period, Brownstein wrote and appeared in a series of comedy sketches alongside Saturday Night Live alumnus  Fred Armisen which were developed into the satirical comedy TV series Portlandia. The series went on to win Emmy and Peabody Awards. Sleater-Kinney eventually reunited; as of 2015, Brownstein was touring with the band as well as in support of her new memoir.

Early life 
Brownstein was born in Seattle, Washington, and was raised in Redmond, Washington. Her mother was a housewife and a teacher, and her father was a corporate lawyer. They divorced when Carrie was 14, and she was raised by her father. Brownstein has a younger sister. Her family is Jewish.

She attended Lake Washington High School before transferring to The Overlake School for her senior year.

Brownstein began playing guitar at 15 and received lessons from Jeremy Enigk. She later said: "He lived in the neighborhood next to mine, so I would just walk my guitar over to his house. He showed me a couple of open chords and I just took it from there. I'd gone through so many phases as a kid with my interests that my parents put their foot down with guitar.

After high school, Brownstein attended Western Washington University before transferring to The Evergreen State College. In 1997, Brownstein graduated from Evergreen with an emphasis on sociolinguistics and stayed in Olympia, Washington, for three years before moving to Portland, Oregon.

Music career

Excuse 17 

While attending Evergreen, Brownstein met fellow students Corin Tucker, Kathleen Hanna, Tobi Vail, and Becca Albee. With Albee and CJ Phillips, she formed the band Excuse 17, one of the pioneering bands of the riot grrrl movement in the Olympia music scene that played an important role in third-wave feminism. Excuse 17 often toured with Tucker's band Heavens to Betsy. The two bands contributed to the Free to Fight compilation. With Tucker, she formed the band Sleater-Kinney as a side project and later released the split single Free to Fight with Cypher in the Snow.

Sleater-Kinney 

After both Excuse 17 and Heavens to Betsy split up, Sleater-Kinney became Brownstein and Tucker's main focus. They recorded their first self-titled album in early 1994 during a trip to Australia, where the pair were celebrating Tucker's graduation from Evergreen (Brownstein still had three years of college left). It was released the following spring. They recorded and toured with different drummers, until Janet Weiss joined the band in 1996. Following their eponymous debut, they released six more studio albums before going on indefinite hiatus in 2006. In a 2012 interview with DIY magazine, Brownstein said that Sleater-Kinney still planned to play in the future. On October 20, 2014, Brownstein announced on Twitter that Sleater-Kinney would be releasing a new album, No Cities to Love, on January 20, 2015, and would tour in early 2015. At the same time the announcement was made, they released the video for the first single from the album. The single, "Bury Our Friends", was also made available as a free MP3 download.

Critics Greil Marcus and Robert Christgau deemed the band one of the essential rock groups of the early 2000s. In 2015, Stereogum Chief Editor Tom Breihan called them the greatest rock band of the past two decades.

Other work 
Brownstein and former Helium guitarist/singer Mary Timony, recording as The Spells, released The Age of Backwards E.P. in 1999.

Also in 1999, Brownstein, Lois Maffeo, and Peter Momtchiloff released a single ("The Touch"/"Louie Louie Got Married") on K Records as The Tentacles.

In summer 2009, Brownstein and Weiss worked together on songs (produced by Tucker Martine) for the soundtrack of the documentary film !Women Art Revolution by Lynn Hershman Leeson.

In September 2010, Brownstein revealed her latest project was the band Wild Flag, with Janet Weiss, Mary Timony, and Rebecca Cole, formerly of The Minders; according to Brownstein, about a year earlier, "I started to need music again, and so I called on my friends and we joined as a band. Chemistry cannot be manufactured or forced, so Wild Flag was not a sure thing, it was a 'maybe, a 'possibility.' But after a handful of practice sessions, spread out over a period of months, I think we all realized that we could be greater than the sum of our parts." They released a self-titled album in September 2011.

In 2011, they toured for a second time and played at CMJ Music Marathon.

Accolades
In 2006, Brownstein was the only woman to earn a spot in the Rolling Stone readers' list of the 25 "Most Underrated Guitarists of All-Time".

Writing career 
Brownstein began a career as a writer before Sleater-Kinney broke up. She interviewed Eddie Vedder, Mary Lynn Rajskub, Karen O, and Cheryl Hines for The Believer magazine. Brownstein has also written a couple of music-related video game reviews for Slate.

From November 2007 to May 2010, Brownstein wrote a blog for NPR Music called "Monitor Mix"; she returned for a final blog post in October, thanking her blog readers and declaring the blog "officially conclude[d]."

In March 2009, Brownstein was contracted to write a book to "describe the dramatically changing dynamic between music fan and performer, from the birth of the iPod and the death of the record store to the emergence of the 'you be the star' culture of American Idol and the ensuing dilution of rock mystique"; The book, called The Sound of Where You Are, was planned to be published by Ecco/HarperCollins. In an April 2012 interview on Marc Maron's WTF podcast, Brownstein said she was no longer working on the book.

Brownstein's memoir, Hunger Makes Me A Modern Girl, was released on October 27, 2015. The book was published by Riverhead Books, an imprint of Penguin Books USA.

In 2020, Ann Wilson, lead singer of hard rock band Heart, announced in an interview that Brownstein was writing the script for a Heart biopic.

Acting career 

Brownstein has acted (what she calls a "mere hobby") in the short film Fan Mail, the experimental feature Group, and the Miranda July film Getting Stronger Every Day. Brownstein and Fred Armisen published several video skits as part of a comedy duo called "ThunderAnt". She also starred opposite James Mercer of The Shins in the 2010 independent film Some Days Are Better Than Others. The film had its world premiere at SXSW on March 13, 2010.

After their ThunderAnt videos, Brownstein and Armisen developed Portlandia, a sketch comedy show shot on location in Portland, for the Independent Film Channel. The two starred in the series and wrote for it with Allison Silverman from The Colbert Report and Jonathan Krisel, a writer for Saturday Night Live. The show, which featured appearances of some of the characters from ThunderAnt, premiered in January 2011. The series received positive feedback and concluded after its eighth season.

From 2014 to 2019, Brownstein played the role of Syd in the Amazon Studios original series Transparent.

In 2015, Brownstein portrayed Genevieve Cantrell in the Todd Haynes film Carol, based on Patricia Highsmith's novel The Price of Salt. However, the majority of her scenes were cut due to the film's length. The film had its world premiere at the Cannes Film Festival on May 17, 2015. It began a limited release on November 20, 2015.

Brownstein has also appeared as a guest on Saturday Night Live, Curb Your Enthusiasm, and Man Seeking Woman, among other shows.

Brownstein starred in and wrote the screenplay for The Nowhere Inn, a 2020 tour mockumentary thriller, with Annie Clark (St. Vincent).

Personal life 
Brownstein was outed as bisexual to her family and the world by Spin when she was 21 years old. The article discussed the fact that she had dated bandmate Corin Tucker in the beginning of Sleater-Kinney (the song "One More Hour" is about their break-up).

In 2006, The New York Times described Brownstein as "openly gay". In a November 2010 interview for Willamette Week, she stated that she identifies as bisexual. She says, "It's weird, because no one's actually ever asked me. People just always assume, like, you're this or that. It's like, 'OK. I'm bisexual. Just ask.'" In a 2020 article, the Los Angeles Times noted that Brownstein and Annie Clark (who performs as St. Vincent) "dated years ago."

Since working together on ThunderAnt, Brownstein and Fred Armisen developed what Brownstein has called "one of the most intimate, functional, romantic, but nonsexual relationships [they have] ever had." According to Armisen, their relationship is "all of the things that I've ever wanted, you know, aside from like the physical stuff, but the intimacy that I have with her is like no other."

Filmography

See also
 List of LGBT people from Portland, Oregon

References

External links 

Official Sleater-Kinney website
 Carrie Brownstein's blog, "Monitor Mix" at NPR (2007-2010)
 Radio interview on Fresh Air (35 minutes; 2015)

1974 births
Actresses from Portland, Oregon
American film actresses
American women bloggers
American bloggers
American punk rock singers
American television actresses
Bisexual actresses
Bisexual Jews
Bisexual musicians
Bisexual women
Women punk rock singers
Feminist musicians
Jewish American actresses
Jewish American musicians
Jewish women writers
Lead guitarists
Living people
Musicians from Portland, Oregon
Musicians from Seattle
People from Redmond, Washington
Riot grrrl musicians
Evergreen State College alumni
Western Washington University alumni
Bisexual feminists
21st-century American actresses
Writers from Portland, Oregon
Writers from Seattle
LGBT Jews
LGBT people from Oregon
LGBT people from Washington (state)
American LGBT singers
Bisexual memoirists
LGBT film directors
American sketch comedians
Singers from Washington (state)
Jews in punk rock
Sleater-Kinney members
Guitarists from Washington (state)
Guitarists from Oregon
Wild Flag members
21st-century American comedians
21st-century American women singers
21st-century American singers
American women memoirists
21st-century American memoirists
21st-century American women guitarists
21st-century American guitarists
20th-century American LGBT people
21st-century American LGBT people
LGBT television directors
21st-century American Jews
American bisexual actors
Women in punk